The 2016 AFL Europe Championship was an 18-a-side Australian rules football competition held in London, United Kingdom between European countries. This was the third AFL Europe Championship, run by AFL Europe. Matches were played at Motspur Park in London. Contested between four national teams, the Championships were won by Great Britain.

Teams
 Great Britain
 Germany
 Ireland
 Sweden

Results

Round 1
  Great Britain: 18.17 (125) d  Sweden: 1.1 (7)
  Ireland: 17.11 (113) d  Germany: 3.0 (18)

Match Reports - Round 1

Round 2
  Germany: 7.14 (56) d  Sweden: 4.4 (28)
  Ireland: 6.5 (41) d  Great Britain: 4.16 (40)

Match Reports - Round 2

Round 3
  Ireland: 19.14 (128) d  Sweden: 0.5 (5)
  Great Britain: 18.14 (121) d  Germany: 0.5 (5)

Match Reports - Round 3

Finals
Grand Final:
  Great Britain: 7.9 (51) d  Ireland: 4.5 (29)

3rd Place Match:
  Germany: 4.6 (30) d  Sweden: 4.5 (29)

Match Reports - Grand Final Day

References

Australian rules football competitions